Rhysida is a large genus of Scolopendromorph centipede in the subfamily Otostigminae. It is the second largest genus in the subfamily Otostigminae, with species found in the Neotropics, Indo-Malaya, and Africa. It shares some morphological characteristics with the genus Alluropus, and its phylogeny in the subfamily Otostigminae is somewhat uncertain.

Species 

 Rhysida afra (Peters, 1855) (Southern Africa, Bangladesh, Bhutan)
 Rhysida anodonta Lawrence, 1968 (Mozambique)
 Rhysida braziliensis Kraeplin, 1903 (Brazil)
 Rhysida calcarata Pocock, 1891 (Southeast Asia)
 Rhysida carinulata Haase, 1887 (Australasia)
 Rhysida celeris (Humbert & Saussure, 1870) (Latin America) common name Blue-Legged Centipede
 Rhysida ceylonica Gravely, 1912 (Sri Lanka)
 Rhysida chacona Verhoeff, 1944 (Argentina)
 Rhysida corbetti Khanna, 1994 (India)
 Rhysida crassispina Kraeplin, 1903 (India)
 Rhysida ikhalama Joshi et al., 2019 (India: Arunachal Pradesh)
 Rhysida immarginata (Porat, 1876) (Congo, Sudan, Indo-Malaya, Latin America)
 Rhysida intermedia Attems, 1910 (Tanzania)
 Rhysida jonesi Lewis, 2002 (Mauritius)
 Rhysida konda Joshi et al., 2019 (India: Orissa)
 Rhysida leviventer Attems,1953 (Laos)
 Rhysida lewisi Joshi et al., 2019 (India: Karnataka)
 Rhysida lithobioides (Newport, 1845) (Somalia, Sumatra)
 Rhysida longicarinulata Khanna & Tripathi, 1986 (India)
 Rhysida longicornis Pocock, 1891 (Socotra)
 Rhysida longipes (Newport, 1845) (Latin America, Florida, Eastern Africa, Chagos Archipelago, Mauritius, East Asia, Indo-Malaysia) common name Minor blueleg
 Rhysida manchurica Miyoshi, 1939 (China: Manchuria)
 Rhysida marginata Attems, 1953 (Vietnam)
 Rhysida monalii Khanna & Kumar, 1984 (India: Uttaranchal)
 Rhysida monticola Pocock, 1891 (Sarawak)
 Rhysida neocrassispina Jangi & Dass, 1984 (India: Tamil Nadu)
 Rhysida nuda (Newport, 1845) (Eastern Australia)
 Rhysida pazhuthara Joshi et al., 2019 (India: Kerala)
 Rhysida polyacantha L. E. Koch, 1985 (Australia)
 Rhysida riograndensis Bücherl, 1939 (Brazil)
 Rhysida rubra Bücherl, 1939 (Brazil)
 Rhysida sada Joshi et al., 2019 (India: Maharashtra)
 Rhysida singaporiensis Verhoeff, 1939 (Bali, Singapore)
 Rhysida stuhlmanni Kraeplin, 1903 (East Africa, Malaysia)
 Rhysida suvana Chamberlain, 1920 (Fiji)
 Rhysida togoensis Kraeplin, 1903 (Central Africa)
 Rhysida trispinosa Jangi & Dass, 1984 (India: Maharashtra)
 Rhysida ventrisulcus Attems,1930 (Congo)
 Rhysida yanagiharai Takakuwa, 1935 (Japan?)

References 

 
Animals described in 1862